Rosy is an unincorporated community in Third River Township, Itasca County, Minnesota, United States.  The community is located northwest of Squaw Lake; near the junction of Itasca County Roads 32, 33, and 141 (8 Mile Road).

Nearby places include Dunbar, Alvwood, Squaw Lake, Max, Northome, and Blackduck.  Rosy is located 8 miles northwest of Squaw Lake; and 16 miles south of Northome.  Rosy is 16 miles east-southeast of Blackduck; and 36 miles northwest of Deer River.

ZIP codes 56630 (Blackduck) and 56681 (Squaw Lake) meet near Rosy.  A post office previously operated in the community of Rosy from 1901 to 1935.

Rosy is located within the Chippewa National Forest and the Blackduck State Forest.

References

 Mn/DOT map of Itasca County – Sheet 2 – 2011 edition

Unincorporated communities in Minnesota
Unincorporated communities in Itasca County, Minnesota